Anigre is an African hardwood commonly used for plywood, interior furniture, cabinetry, and high-end millwork applications. It is frequently sliced and sold as veneer, although it is available in board form as well. In board form it is used for boat building, general carpentry, and other light construction uses.

Characteristics
Anigre has a medium texture with closed pores similar to maple. Growth rings aren't always well-defined, and the wood can be rather plain-looking; though certain figure is occasionally present, such as curly or mottled grain. The sapwood and the heartwood are not usually distinguishable. The heartwood is a light yellowish-brown, sometimes with a pinkish hue. Color tends to darken with age. The quarter figured veneer has become a popular choice for furniture, cabinetry, and decorative architectural applications. It is said to have a faint odor similar to Cedar. In its untreated form Anigre is susceptible to termite and fungi attacks and generally has low durability. Anigre is usually considered easy to work with hand and power tools, although depending on the origin of the wood it can have a high silica content which can dull wood working tools quickly.

Origins
Anigre is often found in tropical East and West Africa, primarily in Cameroon but also in Angola, Congo, Ethiopia, Ghana, Guinea Bissau, Ivory Coast, Kenya, Nigeria, Sierra Leone, Uganda and Zaire. Exportation from Cameroon is prohibited by local laws.

Common names
Anigre, Anegre, Aniegre, Aniegré, Aningré, Aningeria, Aninguerie, Mugangu, Muna, Osan, Anegre Blanc, Longhi, Mukaly, Tanganyika Nuss. Common pronunciations vary from Ah-Nee-Grey, Ah-Nee-Gra, Anna-Gra, Anna-Grey, Uh-Nee-Grey.

Scientific names
Genus: Pouteria Family: Sapotaceae (Angiosperm).  Aningeria Altissima, Aningeria Robusta, Aningeria Superba, Gambeyobotrys Gigantea

References

Wood
Chrysophylloideae
Plant common names